The Siren is a musical in three acts, adapted from the operetta Die Sirene, with music by Leo Fall and text by Leo Stein and A. M. Willner. This was first performed in Vienna on January 5, 1911.

The Siren was adapted into English by Harry B. Smith. In addition to Fall's score, it featuring songs by Jerome Kern and others, with additional lyrics Adrian Ross and others. It was first produced on Broadway by Charles Frohman at the Knickerbocker Theatre from August 28, 1911 to December 16 of the same year, playing for 116 performances. It was directed by Thomas Reynolds.

Synopsis
The police believe that a handsome marquis is writing satiric letters about the government. They hire a beautiful young woman to prove the case.

Roles and original cast
Armand, Marquis de Ravaillac – Donald Brian
Lolotte – Julia Sanderson
Baron Siegfried Bazilos – Frank Moulan
Robertine – Veronique Banner
Pepi – Sara Carr
Grion – Gilbert Childs
Alberta – Gene Cole
Freda – Ethel Davis
Magda – Louise Donovan
Clarisse – Elizabeth Firth
Mimi – Jane Hall
Toni – Ethel Kelly
Ladislas – Victor Le Roy
Franzi – Helen May
Frau Eisenbehr – Florence Morrison
Malipote – F. Pope Stamper
Hannibal Beckmesser – Will West
Yvonne – Pauline Delorme
Ninon – Beatrice D'Essling
Justine – Clementine Dundas
Suzanne – Moya Mannering

References

Sources
 Bordman, Gerald. American Musical Theatre: A Chronicle (1978), Oxford University Press

External links
 The Siren at the Internet Broadway Database

Musicals by Jerome Kern
Compositions by Leo Fall
1911 musicals
Broadway musicals
Musicals based on operas